Alexander Johansson (born 27 January 2000) is a Swedish football striker who plays for Halmstads BK.

References

2000 births
Living people
Swedish footballers
Association football forwards
Halmstads BK players
Superettan players
Allsvenskan players